Paul Goulet (born February 25, 1958) is a speaker, author, writer and consultant from Nevada. In 2013, Goulet was recognized as a Distinguished Nevadan by the Nevada System of Higher Education.

Biography

Formal Education 
Paul Goulet has earned a bachelor's degree from University of Ottawa. He has also received a master's degree from Ashland University.

Career 
Paul Goulet serves as Senior Pastor of International Church of Las Vegas, a multi-site congregation in Las Vegas, Nevada. Retired from this church in March 2022

The church's three local campuses welcome thousands of worshipers from the Las Vegas metropolitan area on a weekly basis. The church's online extension, iChurch, broadcasts many church services live. The church also hosts International Christian Academy, which educates students ranging from preschool through grade 8, as well as Kairos School of Ministry, a CPP campus of Northwest University.

Goulet has said his goal is to build 2000 churches by the year 2020 through partnerships with Pastors and Bible schools worldwide. He has partnered with John C. Maxwell's EQUIP organization to bring leadership training to Las Vegas, France and other locations.

He has also authored several books and previously hosted and produced the local television program 2020 Vision.

Bibliography 
 Crossing Your Next Threshold (2006)
 The Five Powers of God (2007, Thomas Nelson)
 The Transformed Family (2008)
 The Keys of The Kingdom (2014)

References

External links 
 International Church of Las Vegas

Living people
American Christian clergy
1958 births
American male writers